Harvard University Press (HUP) is a publishing house established on January 13, 1913, as a division of Harvard University, and focused on academic publishing. It is a member of the Association of University Presses. After the retirement of William P. Sisler in 2017, the university appointed as George Andreou as director.

The press maintains offices in Cambridge, Massachusetts near Harvard Square, and in London, England. The press co-founded the distributor TriLiteral LLC with MIT Press and Yale University Press. TriLiteral was sold to LSC Communications in 2018.

Notable authors published by HUP include Eudora Welty, Walter Benjamin, E. O. Wilson, John Rawls, Emily Dickinson, Stephen Jay Gould, Helen Vendler, Carol Gilligan, Amartya Sen, David Blight, Martha Nussbaum, and Thomas Piketty.

The Display Room in Harvard Square, dedicated to selling HUP publications, closed on June 17, 2009.

Related publishers, imprints, and series
HUP owns the Belknap Press imprint, which it inaugurated in May 1954 with the publication of the Harvard Guide to American History. The John Harvard Library book series is published under the Belknap imprint, which was established through an endowment from the estate of art historian and Harvard alumnus Waldron Phoenix Belknap Jr. 

Harvard University Press distributes the Loeb Classical Library and is the publisher of the I Tatti Renaissance Library, the Dumbarton Oaks Medieval Library, and the Murty Classical Library of India.

It is distinct from Harvard Business Press, which is part of Harvard Business Publishing, and the independent Harvard Common Press.

Awards
Its 2011 publication Listed: Dispatches from America's Endangered Species Act by Joe Roman received the 2012 Rachel Carson Environment Book Award from the Society of Environmental Journalists.

Publications

See also

 List of English-language book publishing companies
 List of university presses

References

Bibliography

External links 

 
 Blog of Harvard University Press

 
1913 establishments in Massachusetts
Book publishing companies based in Massachusetts
Press
Publishing companies established in 1913
University presses of the United States
Visual arts publishing companies